Freddy Quintero (born 24 May 1938) is a Venezuelan fencer. He competed in the individual and team foil events at the 1960 Summer Olympics.

References

External links
 

1938 births
Living people
Venezuelan male foil fencers
Olympic fencers of Venezuela
Fencers at the 1960 Summer Olympics
Sportspeople from Caracas
Pan American Games medalists in fencing
Pan American Games silver medalists for Venezuela
Fencers at the 1959 Pan American Games
20th-century Venezuelan people
21st-century Venezuelan people